Lagenaria abyssinica is a species of squash plant. It is a climbing vine. The stem and branches are covered in hair-like spines. It ranges from Africa to Asia. The fruit is used to make bottles and instruments. It is also grown as an ornamental plant.

References

External links
 Lagenaria abyssinica info
 

Cucurbitoideae